HMS Tiger was a torpedo boat destroyer of the Royal Navy. Built by John Brown on Clydebank as a three funnel 30-knot destroyer on speculation she was purchased by the Royal Navy under the 1899 – 1900 Naval Estimates.

In 1908, she collided with the armoured cruiser HMS Berwick during a night exercise and sank.

Construction
On 31 March 1900, as part of the 1899–1900 construction programme for the Royal Navy, the British Admiralty purchased three destroyers that were being built by the Clydebank shipbuilder John Brown and Company as speculative builds, yard numbers 334, 335 and 336 (to become , Tiger and  respectively). The three ships closely resembled , built by the shipbuilder as part of the 1896–1897 programme. Displacement was  light and  full load. Three funnels were fitted.

The ships were required to reach a speed of  during sea trials and carry an armament of a single QF 12 pounder 12 cwt ( calibre) gun, backed up by five 6-pounder guns, and two 18-inch (450 mm) torpedo tubes. An arched turtleback forecastle was fitted. The ship had a crew of 63 officers and ratings.

Tiger was launched on 19 May 1900. The ship was completed and accepted by the Royal Navy in June 1901.

Service
Tiger was commissioned at Devonport 21 August 1901, and assigned to the Portsmouth Flotilla of the Home Fleet. She spent her entire operational career in Home Waters.

On the night of 25 September 1907, Tiger ran aground on the breakwater of Portland Harbour tearing off a large length of the ship's keel and holing the ship.

On 2 April 1908 Tiger took part in a Home Fleet exercise in the English Channel 18 miles south of the Isle of Wight. Part of the exercise was to test fleet defence against a torpedo boat night attack, with all ships running without lights. Tiger was cut in two with the forward section sinking almost immediately. The stern remained afloat long enough to 22 members of her crew to be rescued, but 36 men, including Tigers captain, Lieutenant W.E. Middleton were lost.

References

Bibliography

External links
 http://www.pbenyon.plus.com/18-1900/T/04692.html

 

Ships built on the River Clyde
1900 ships
C-class destroyers (1913)
World War I destroyers of the United Kingdom
Maritime incidents in 1908
Ships sunk in collisions
Shipwrecks in the English Channel